Koderma Thermal Power Station is a coal-based thermal power plant located in Banjhedih, Jainagar CD block, Koderma district in the Indian state of Jharkhand. The power plant is operated by the Damodar Valley Corporation.

Capacity
It has an installed capacity of 1000 Mega Watts.

References

External links

Coal-fired power stations in Jharkhand
Koderma district
Kodarma
2013 establishments in Jharkhand
Energy infrastructure completed in 2013